Nawabzada Abdul Razzaq Khan Niazi is a Pakistani politician who had been a Member of the Provincial Assembly of the Punjab, from May 2013 to May 2018.

Early life and education
He was born on 7 July 1950 in Murree.

He graduated in 1970 from Forman Christian College and has a degree of Bachelor of Arts.

Political career

He ran for the seat of the Provincial Assembly of the Punjab as a candidate of Pakistan Peoples Party (PPP) from Constituency PP-177 (Khanewal-IV) in 1988 Pakistani general election but was unsuccessful. He received 23,329 votes and lost the seat to Irfan Ahmad Khan, a candidate of Islami Jamhoori Ittehad (IJI).

He ran for the seat of the Provincial Assembly of the Punjab as a candidate of Pakistan Democratic Alliance (PDA) from Constituency PP-177 (Khanewal-IV) in 1990 Pakistani general election but was unsuccessful. He received 23,844 votes and lost the seat to Irfan Ahmad Khan, a candidate of IJI.

He ran for the seat of the Provincial Assembly of the Punjab as an independent candidate from Constituency PP-177 (Khanewal-IV) in 1993 Pakistani general election but was unsuccessful. He received 10,957 votes and lost the seat to Irfan Ahmad Khan, a candidate of Pakistan Muslim League (N) (PML-N).

He was elected to the Provincial Assembly of the Punjab as a candidate of Pakistan Muslim League (Q) (PML-Q) from Constituency PP-218 (Khanewal-VII) in 2002 Pakistani general election. He received 48,120 votes and defeated Aslam Bodla.

He ran for the seat of the Provincial Assembly of the Punjab as a candidate of PML-Q from Constituency PP-218 (Khanewal-VII) in 2008 Pakistani general election but was unsuccessful. He received 32,043 votes and lost the seat to Muhammad Jamil Shah, a candidate of Pakistan Peoples Party (PPP).

He was re-elected to the Provincial Assembly of the Punjab as an Independent candidate from Constituency PP-218 (Khanewal-VII) in 2013 Pakistani general election. He received 34,661 votes and defeated Peer Muhammad Jameel Shah, a candidate of PML-N.

In May 2018, he joined Pakistan Tehreek-e-Insaf (PTI).

References

Living people
Punjab MPAs 2013–2018
1950 births
Punjab MPAs 2002–2007